Zone is a 1995 Japanese experimental short film directed by Takashi Ito. It features a headless figure restrained to a chair, surrounded by a ghostly, masked figure, a model train, and other imagery.

In 1996, Zone won a Main Prize at the International Short Film Festival in Oberhausen, Germany.

Themes and interpretations
Ito described Zone thus:
A film about a man without a face. His arms and legs bound with ropes, a disabled man is still without even a quiver in a white room. This man, enwrapped in wild delusions, is also a reconstruction of myself. A series of unusual scenes in this room that expresses what lies inside me. I tried to create a connection between memories, nightmares and violent images.

Chihiro Minato, curator of the 2000 arts exhibition Serendipity: Photography, Video, Experimental Film and Multimedia Installation from Asia, wrote that Zone displays "the subject as an insubstantial surface" that is "suffused within ... [and] ... turns into a rapidly changing game of speed and afterimages." Chihiro likened the film to a séance, a parallel he argues is reflected in its setting: "a bleak, artificial environment surrounded by steel-reinforced concrete walls."

In 2015, following its screening at the 61st International Short Film Festival in Oberhausen, Yaron Dahan of Mubi described Zone as a culmination of the experimentation Ito exhibited in his previous films Thunder (1982), Ghost (1984), and Grim (1985). In Zone, Dahan writes, a "headless plaster-man is bound to a chair surrounded by recognizable images from his previous work. A ghost inhabits this imagined space: a Noh-masked, light-draped child-demon haunting the artist's passage into the life stage of fatherhood, necessitating a re-evaluation if not reinvention of the self."

Home media
In 2009, Zone was released on DVD along with 19 other films by Ito as part of the Takashi Ito Film Anthology. The DVD includes behind-the-scenes images of construction plans used in the production of Zone.

References

External links
 

1995 films
1995 short films
1990s Japanese films
1990s avant-garde and experimental films
Japanese avant-garde and experimental films
Japanese short films
Films shot in 16 mm film